Radiate Like This is the fourth studio album by American indie rock band Warpaint, released on May 6, 2022, through Heirlooms and Virgin Records. It marks their first album in six years, and was announced alongside the release of the song "Champion". The band will tour the UK and Europe in support of the album.

Background
Warpaint's preceding album, Heads Up, was released in 2016. Following the release of that album, the band members encountered different priorities, such as "babies, jobs, tours, solo albums, intercontinental and cross country moves", which initially presented "mounting logistical challenges" and doubts about whether they could regroup to work on new material.

Recording
The band began work on the album with producer Sam Petts-Davies in early 2020, but the COVID-19 pandemic caused them to finish recording their parts in their own "makeshift home studios". Although finishing recording "some time ago", they waited to release the album until they could tour to promote it. This self-imposed delay also helped them to "further hone", build and then reconstruct each song. In a press release, Emily Kokal joked that the band should have called it Exquisite Corpse instead of their debut EP.

Critical reception

Radiate Like This received a score of 79 out of 100 based on 10 reviews on review aggregator Metacritic, indicating "generally favorable" reception.

Track listing

Personnel
Warpaint
 Emily Kokal – lead and backing vocals, guitar, keyboards, electronics, production
 Jenny Lee Lindberg – bass, backing and lead vocals, production
 Theresa Wayman – lead and backing vocals, guitar, synthesizer, production
 Stella Mozgawa – drums, keyboards, backing vocals, production

Additional musicians
 Vanessa Freebairn-Smith – strings on "Trouble"

Technical
 Sam Petts-Davies – production, engineering, mixing
 Tucker Martine – mixing, additional production (2–4, 6–9)
 Ewan Pearson – mixing (1)
 Ivan Wayman – mixing, additional production (10)
 John Congleton – additional production and engineering (5, 9)
 Emily Lazar – mastering

Design
 Ikhoor Studio – design, layout
 Jaysun Rickards – cover, photographs

Charts

References

2022 albums
Virgin Records albums
Warpaint (band) albums